Mason Bernard guitars are primarily stratocaster-style solid body electric guitar and electric acoustics made from 1990 to 1992 by Bernie Rico, the founder of B.C. Rich, and feature the "M Bernard" branding on the headstock. It is believed that about 225 guitars were made, but there are examples of Mason Bernard guitars with serial numbers as high as 352 and at least one acoustic model has been discovered in the wild.

There were two electric models and one limited acoustic model produced. The MB-1 was based on the BC Rich ST III body, and featured a humbucker pickup in the bridge position and single coil pickups in the middle and neck positions. The Standard model was based on the BC Rich Assassin template, and had a slanted humbucker pickup in the bridge position and a slanted single coil pickup in the neck. All models were handmade, and featured a recess behind the lower horn to make access to the upper frets easier. Both electric models were produced with bolt-on necks, however there are examples of neck-through construction. The bolt-on models had an angled neck plate to further facilitate better access to higher frets.

The BE-140 acoustic featured a piezo pickup in the bridge and a 21 fret cut-away body style. They are even more rare than the electrics with only one known example found "in the wild" with others only being built to order.

Most of the Mason Bernards have plain ebony finger boards, however there are some special player guitars that feature inlays. Many Mason Bernard guitars have custom graphics. They were made with both normal and reversed headstocks. There are examples of both non-recessed and recessed Floyd Rose tremolos.

References 	

B.C. Rich electric guitars
Electric guitars